Julie Mayer may refer to:

Julie Mayer (Desperate Housewives), a character from the U.S. television series Desperate Housewives
Julie Mayer (broadcaster), former BBC radio presenter

See also
Julie Meyer, American born entrepreneur and inventor
Julie May (born 1964), English cricketer